Justice Iqbal Ahmed Ansari (born 29 October 1954) is the Incumbent Chairperson of  Punjab State Human Rights Commission and former Chief Justice of Patna High Court.

Career
He did his graduation in Law from Tezpur Law College. He was elevated to Guwahati High Court on 4 March 2004. He also served as Executive Chairman of State Legal Services Authority in Arunachal Pradesh and Nagaland and has accordingly performed the duty of legal awareness.

In July 2016 he became the Chief Justice of Patna High Court and retired in October 2016.

On 1 August 2017 he was appointed Chairperson of Punjab State Human Rights Commission.

References

Living people
Indian judges
Indian human rights activists
1954 births
Chief Justices of the Patna High Court
Judges of the Gauhati High Court